Trojans Youth and Community Group is an intermediate football club based in Derry, Northern Ireland, currently playing in the Northern Ireland Intermediate League. The club was founded in 1938 by Edmund Carton and is based in the Creggan area of Derry. The club also has a youth development set-up participating in the NIBFA National League and Derry and District Youth Football Association.

Team

Senior
The Senior Trojans team, also known as the 'Trojans Intermediate Team', participates in the Northern Ireland Intermediate League. They play from Trojans' base at Oakland Park in the Creggan Estate.

Youth
Trojans YCG has a number of youth teams who participate in the under-age leagues of the NIBFA National Youth League and Derry and District Youth Football Association. Trojans has a structured player pathway and intakes children as young as 5 years of age. Coaching Staff are vetted on an annual basis and hold Irish FA and UEFA coaching certificates and diplomas. The club regularly sends youth teams to international tournaments and contributes a number of players to the Derry and District League Select, which competes in the Foyle Cup.

Past players
The club has produced many professional players, including Derry City midfielder Kevin Deery Stoke City winger James McClean and York City defender Darren Kelly among others.

Players
Kevin Deery
Gerard Doherty
Darren Kelly
Owen Morrison
James McClean

Honours

Intermediate honours
Northern Ireland Intermediate League: 1
2014–15

External links
 Clubs official website
 NI Intermediate League

Association football clubs in Derry Urban Area
Association football clubs established in 1938
1938 establishments in Northern Ireland